Chic de ville is the seventh studio album by Canadian rock musician Daniel Bélanger, released March 5, 2013 on Audiogram. Inspired in part by his experience composing a theatrical score for a 2010 production of Michel Tremblay's play Les Belles-sœurs, on Chic de ville Bélanger explores elements of country music and rockabilly.

The album debuted at #2 on the Canadian Albums Chart. Most of the album was previewed on CBC Radio's À Propos, a program devoted to exposing French-language music from Quebec to a Canada-wide audience, on the weekend of March 2 and 3, 2013.

Track listing
 "Ouverture" (0:31)
 "Chacun pour soi" (5:48)
 "Sa félinité" (2:50)
 "Béatitude" (3:39)
 "Avec mes amis" (2:28)
 "L'Aube" (3:08)
 "Auprès de toi" (2:59)
 "Le temps est charognard" (2:52)
 "Domino" (2:41)
 "Je t'aime comme tu es" (3:11)
 "Je poursuis mon bonheur" (2:29)
 "Traverse-moi" (3:50)
 "Le Cœur en mille morceaux" (2:19)
 "Pour être heureux" (2:26)
 "Rapport d'accident survenu le 26" (4:14)

References

2013 albums
Daniel Bélanger albums
Audiogram (label) albums